There were 14 boxing events at the 2010 South American Games: 11 men's events and 3 women's events. Competitions were held over March 22–27.  All games were played at Sabaneta.

Medal summary

Medal table

Men

Women

References

 
Boxing
South American Games
2010